Meganaclia sippia is a moth of the family Erebidae. It was described by Plötz in 1880. It is found in Cameroon, the Republic of Congo, the Democratic Republic of Congo, Equatorial Guinea, Ghana, Ivory Coast, Kenya, Niger, Nigeria, Sierra Leone, Tanzania and Uganda.

The larvae are reported to be polyphagous.

References

 Natural History Museum Lepidoptera generic names catalog

Syntomini
Moths described in 1880
Erebid moths of Africa